The 1832 United States presidential election in Virginia took place between November 2 and December 5, 1832, as part of the 1832 United States presidential election. Voters chose 23 representatives, or electors to the Electoral College, who voted for President and Vice President.

Virginia voted for the Democratic Party candidate, incumbent President Andrew Jackson, over the National Republican candidate, Henry Clay, and the Anti-Masonic Party candidate, William Wirt. Jackson won Virginia by a margin of 49.93%.

Results

References

Virginia
1832
1832 Virginia elections